Thomas Burgess  (1 October 1791 – 27 November 1854) was an English Roman Catholic prelate who served as the Bishop of Clifton from 1851 to 1854.

Early life and ministry
Born in Clayton Green, Lancashire on 1 October 1791, he was educated at Ampleforth Abbey, where he took the profession as a Benedictine on 13 October 1807. Burgess was ordained to the priesthood in 1813 and elected Prior of Ampleforth in July 1818. He left Ampleforth and the Benedictine Order in 1830, and became a secular clergyman in order to assist Bishop Peter Baines establishing Prior Park College, Bath, Somerset. His next ministry appointments were first to Cannington, then to Portland Chapel, Bath, and finally to Monmouth where he served from 1835 to 1851. When he was appointed the local Roman Catholics were meeting in the Robin Hood Inn and they were not allowed to build St Mary's Roman Catholic Church until 1837.

His last appointment before elevated to the Episcopate was as Vicar General of Newport.

Episcopal career
He was appointed the Bishop of the Diocese of Clifton by the Holy See on 27 June 1851, and consecrated at St George's Cathedral, Southwark on 27 July 1851. The principal consecrator was Cardinal Nicholas Wiseman, Archbishop of Westminster and the principal co-consecrators were Bishop William Wareing of Northampton and Bishop William Bernard Ullathorne of Birmingham.

He died in office in Westbury-on-Trym, Bristol on 27 November 1854, aged 63.

References

1791 births
1854 deaths
People educated at Ampleforth College
English Benedictines
19th-century Roman Catholic bishops in England
Roman Catholic bishops of Clifton